Hubert Roberts (יוברט רוברטס; born January 21, 1961) is an American-Israeli former basketball player. He played the center position. He played nine seasons in the Israel Basketball Premier League.

Biography

His mother was of Jewish descent. Roberts is 6' 8" (2.02 meters) tall. He played for San Diego University.

Roberts played nine seasons in the Israel Basketball Premier League for Hapoel Haifa, Hapoel Jerusalem, Maccabi Haifa, and Rishon LeZion. He observed: "I have kids. The atmosphere for child rearing is better here than in 85 percent of the places in the States for blacks."

References 

Living people
American men's basketball players
Israeli American
Israeli men's basketball players
Jewish American sportspeople
Jewish men's basketball players
Hapoel Haifa B.C. players
Maccabi Haifa B.C. players
Israeli Basketball Premier League players
1961 births
American expatriate basketball people in Israel
Centers (basketball)
Hapoel Jerusalem B.C. players
Israeli people of American descent
San Diego State Aztecs men's basketball players